Grip is a free Compact Disc player and CD ripper.

The software is rather similar to Audiograbber on Windows - without sound card capture feature; it is fast, lightweight, and easy to compile.

Grip uses a selection of encoders, including cdparanoia.

History
The original author, Mike Oliphant, originally registered Grip as a project at SourceForge.net, the free and open-source software website, on March 17, 2000, and made pre-compiled binaries for RPM Linux distributions available. However, by mid-2005 development had stalled, and while the software was still very much usable, in effect it languished without a maintainer. In late 2016, a new maintainer, Johnny Solbu, stepped up by forking the project into "Grip 2" based on version 3.3.1 of the original. In April 2017, he gained access to the original project page and stated on the forked project page his intention on moving development back to the old project, and released v3.3.5. As of February 26, 2018, the current released version is 3.6.3. Development seems to be on-going and the current release works well.

Features 
 Full-featured CD player with a small screen footprint in "condensed" mode
 Database lookup/submission to share track information over the net
 HTTP proxy support for those behind firewalls
 Loop, shuffle, and playlist modes
 Ripping of single, multiple, or partial tracks
 Encoding of ripped .wav files into Ogg Vorbis, MP3 or FLAC files.
 Simultaneous rip and encode
 Support for multiple encode processes on SMP machines
 Adding ID3v1/v2 tags to MP3 files after encoded
 Cooperating with DigitalDJ, a MySQL-based MP3 jukebox

Gallery

See also 

 Sound Juicer – The official CD ripper of GNOME
 Asunder – Another GTK-based CD ripper

References

External links

 
 
  a fork
  a fork launched december 30, 2016

Audio software that uses GTK
Free audio software
Free software programmed in C
Linux CD ripping software
Optical disc-related software that uses GTK